Popcorn is a 1967 jazz album by vocalist Luiz Henrique and organist Walter Wanderley with band on Verve Records. The album features Luiz Henrique, guitar and vocals, Walter Wanderley, organ; Sivuca, accordion; Romeo Penque, flute, Affonso de Paula, percussion, with James Kappes, Gary Chester, or Donald MacDonald on drums.

Track list

Personnel 
 Sivuca - accordion
 David Krieger - art direction
 José Marino – bass
 Donald MacDonald (tracks: 3 to 5, 8 to 10), Gary Chester (2) (tracks: 2), James Kappes (tracks: 1, 6, 7, 1) – drums
 Melvin Tax (tracks: 1, 2, 6, 7, 11), Romeo Penque (tracks: 3 to 5, 8 to 10) – flute
 Luiz Henrique – guitar, vocals
 Walter Wanderley – organ, electric Piano, harpsichord
 Alfonso De Paula (tracks: 2), Luiz Henrique (tracks: 1, 3 to 11) - percussion
 Bob Morgan - producer

References

1967 albums
Walter Wanderley albums
Luiz Henrique Rosa albums